Olivier Missoup is a French rugby union player, born 5 February 1981 in Neuilly-sur-Seine (Hauts-de-Seine), who plays as a flanker for US Oyonnax (1.93 m, 95 kg).

Career 
 Racing Métro 92
 Stade Français Paris
 2005–2006 : Stade aurillacois
 2006–2008 : US Oyonnax
 2008–2012 : RC Toulon
 2012–2014 : Stade Français Paris
 2014- : US Oyonnax

External links
  Player profile at lequipe.fr
  Statistics at itsrugby.fr

1981 births
Living people
Sportspeople from Neuilly-sur-Seine
French rugby union players
Rugby union flankers
Stade Français players
RC Toulonnais players